Bryan Strong (December 24, 1946 – December 25, 2006) was a provincial politician from Alberta, Canada. He served as a member of the Legislative Assembly of Alberta from 1986 to 1989 as a member of the New Democratic Party.

Political career
In the 1986 Alberta general election, Strong ran in the electoral district of St. Albert as a candidate of the New Democratic Party. He defeated incumbent Myrna Fyfe and former MLA Ernie Jamison. He served a single term and did not run again at the dissolution of the legislature in 1989.

References

External links
Legislative Assembly of Alberta Members Listing

1946 births
2006 deaths
Alberta New Democratic Party MLAs
People from St. Albert, Alberta